The mezzo-soprano is the middle female voice and the most common of the female singing voices, which tends to dominate in non-classical music, with vocal range that typically lies between the A below "middle C" (C4) to the A two octaves above (i.e. A3–A5). In the lower and upper extremes, some mezzo-sopranos may extend down to the F below middle C (F3) and as high as "high C" (C6). The mezzo-soprano voice (unlike the soprano voice) is strong in the middle register and weaker in the head register, resulting in a deeper tone than the soprano voice.

The term mezzo-soprano was developed in relation to classical and operatic voices, where the classification is based not merely on the singer's vocal range but also on the tessitura and timbre of the voice. For classical and operatic singers, their voice type determines the roles they will sing and is a primary method of categorization. In non-classical music, singers are primarily defined by their genre and their gender not their vocal range. When the terms soprano, mezzo-soprano, contralto, tenor, baritone, and bass are used as descriptors of non-classical voices, they are applied more loosely than they would be to those of classical singers and generally refer only to the singer's perceived vocal range.

The following is a list of singers in country, popular music, jazz, heavy metal, classical-crossover, and musical theatre who have been described as mezzo-sopranos.

List of names

See also

 List of contraltos in non-classical music
 List of sopranos in non-classical music
 List of tenors in non-classical music
 List of baritones in non-classical music
 List of basses in non-classical music
 Voice classification in non-classical music

Notes

References

 Non-classical music
Lists of singers
Lists of women in music